is an underground metro station located in the city of Kadoma, Osaka, Japan, operated by Osaka Metro.

Lines
Kadoma-minami Station is a terminus of the Nagahori Tsurumi-ryokuchi Line, and is located 15.0 km from the opposing terminus of the line at Taishō Station.

Station layout
The station has one underground island platform serving two tracks and fenced with platform gates.

Platforms

History
The station was opened on October 29, 1997

Passenger statistics
In fiscal 2019, the station was used by an average of 11,360 passengers daily.

Surrounding area
Towa Pharmaceutical RACTAB Dome
 Osaka Tsurumi Hanaki Regional Wholesale Market

See also
List of railway stations in Japan

References

External links

Official home page 

Railway stations in Japan opened in 1997
Railway stations in Osaka Prefecture
Osaka Metro stations
Kadoma, Osaka